Aapsta is a river in Abkhazia. It originates on the southern slopes of the Achbikhvdar ridge in the  Gudauta pass area in beech forests at 1445 meters above sea level; flows into the Black Sea between the village  and the city Gudauta.

Physical and geographical characteristics 
The length of the river is 35 kilometers, the catchment area is 243 km2, the slope of the river is 41.3 ‰, the prevailing width of the river is 15 meters, the depth is from 0.3 to 2.1 meters with a current speed of 1.3-1.6 m / s.

In the middle and lower reaches of the coast, overgrown with beech-hornbeam forest.

The predominant type of feeding is snow feeding in the upper reaches; closer to the mouth, rain feeding becomes important. Average mineralization of waters is 213 mg / l. The type of water regime is the Black Sea, floods occur at all seasons.

Through the Dokhurtu tributary, Aapsta is connected with the cave system .

Tributaries 
The Aapsta has 83 tributaries, the density of its river basin is 0.77 km / km2. The main tributaries are:
 Dohurta - left tributary
 Mtsara - left tributary
 Dzish  - left tributary
 Dry  - left tributary
 Noisy - right tributary
 Fast - left tributary
 Spinal - left tributary
 Mtsaga - right tributary

Etymology 
Hydronym comes from the Abkhaz language, from the Abkhazian "aaps" translates as "yew river".

References 

Rivers of Abkhazia
Rivers of Georgia (country)
Tributaries of the Black Sea